Jean d'Arcy (died August 13, 1344) was a French bishop. He was bishop of Mende (1330-1331), bishop of Autun (1331-1342) and bishop of Langres (1342-1344).

References

Year of birth missing
1344 deaths
Bishops of Mende
Bishops of Autun
Bishops of Langres
14th-century French Roman Catholic bishops
14th-century peers of France